John Bradfield may refer to:

 John Bradfield (engineer) (1867–1943), Australian engineer, designer of the Sydney Harbour Bridge
 John Ross Bradfield (1899–1983), Canadian businessman
 John Bradfield (bishop) (died 1283), Bishop of Rochester
 John Bradfield (biologist) (1925–2014), British biologist, founder of Cambridge Science Park